The Rätisches Grauvieh is an endangered Swiss breed of cattle from the Graubünden in eastern Switzerland. It is a smaller type of the Tiroler Grauvieh breed of Alpine grey cattle. In the 1920s it was absorbed into the Braunvieh population. In 1985 the population was re-established by the introduction of cattle of the similar Albula type from Austria. Like the Rhaetian Alps, it is named for the Ancient Roman province of Rhaetia.

History 

In the Graubünden, in eastern Switzerland, there were two strains of the Alpine Tiroler Grauvieh: the large and heavy Oberländer type, and the smaller Albula type. They were triple-purpose animals, reared for draught use, for milk, and for meat. In the 1920s, they were absorbed into the Braunvieh population. In 1985, cattle of the Albula type were re-introduced to the area from Austria by ProSpecieRara in order to re-establish the breed. In 2015 a population of 2000 was reported.

References

Cattle breeds originating in Switzerland